The  was a treaty signed by the United States, Great Britain, France and Japan at the Washington Naval Conference on 13 December 1921. It was partly a follow-on to the Lansing-Ishii Treaty, signed between the U.S. and Japan. This was a treaty related to Treaty for the Limitation of Naval Armament that attempted to maintain peace in the Pacific.  It was signed at Washington, D.C. on 13 December 1921.

By the Four-Power Treaty, all parties agreed to maintain the status quo in the Pacific, by respecting the Pacific territories of the other countries signing the agreement, not seeking further territorial expansion, and mutual consultation with each other in the event of a dispute over territorial possessions. However, the main result of the Four-Power Treaty was the termination of the Anglo-Japanese Alliance of 1902.

The powers agreed to respect each other’s Pacific island dependencies for ten years.

Notes

References
 Ian H. Nish, The Anglo-Japanese Alliance: The Diplomacy of Two Island Empires 1894–1907, The Athlone Press, London and Dover NH, first published 1966.
 J. Chal Vinson, "The Drafting of the Four-Power Treaty of the Washington Conference," Journal of Modern History 25#1 (Mar., 1953), pp. 40–47 online.

External links
 the full text of the Four-Power Treaty

Treaties of the United States
1921 in the United States
1921 in the United Kingdom
1921 in France
1921 in Japan
1921 treaties
Interwar-period treaties
Treaties concluded in 1921
Treaties of the Empire of Japan
United Kingdom–United States treaties